Carolean can refer to:
 Restoration style, a decorative style popular in England from 1660 to the 1680s
 Caroleans, soldiers of the Swedish kings Charles XI and Charles XII

See also

Carolan (surname)
Carole Ann